My Life is the second album released by singer-songwriter Iris DeMent. Released in 1994 on Warner Bros., it peaked at number 16 on the Billboard Heatseekers chart.

The album was dedicated to her father, Patric Shaw DeMent, who died in 1992.

Critical reception

Spin ranked My Life as the 3rd best album of 1994. Writing in Spin, Eric Weisbard described the album as "...unbreakable gentleness as a modern epiphany about rural values."

The album was nominated for the Grammy Award for Best Contemporary Folk Album at the 37th Annual Grammy Awards.

Track listing
All songs by Iris DeMent except as indicated.

Side one
"Sweet Is the Melody" – 3:41
"You've Done Nothing Wrong" – 4:22
"Calling for You" – 3:18
"Childhood Memories" – 4:38
"No Time to Cry" – 6:49

Side two
"Troublesome Waters" (Maybelle Carter, Ezra J. Carter, Dixie Deen) – 5:15
"Mom and Dad's Waltz" (Lefty Frizzell) – 2:37
"Easy's Gettin' Harder Every Day" – 5:01
"The Shores of Jordan" – 3:18
"My Life" – 3:30

Personnel
Iris DeMent – vocals, acoustic guitar, harmony vocal, piano on "My Life"
Richard Bennett – acoustic guitar, electric guitar
John Catchings – cello
"Cowboy" Jack Clement – acoustic guitar
Charles Cochran – piano, keyboards
Stuart Duncan – fiddle, mandolin
Mark Howard – acoustic guitar
Roy Huskey, Jr. – upright bass
Kenny Malone – percussion
Pat McInerney – drums
Phil Parlapiano – accordion on "You've Done Nothing Wrong"
Al Perkins – dobro
Pete Wasner – keyboards, piano
Joy White – harmony vocal on "Childhood Memories"
Linda Williams – harmony vocal on "The Shores of Jordan"
Robin Williams – harmony vocal on "The Shores of Jordan"

References

1994 albums
Iris DeMent albums
Warner Records albums